The Shell Answer Man was a series of television advertisements from the 1960s through the 1990s sponsored by Royal Dutch Shell in which answers were provided to common questions from the public about driving, with advice on vehicle maintenance, repair and safety, as well as guidance to users of home heating oil. Companion booklets, a series titled the Shell Answer Books, were inserted into major magazines and distributed as free giveaways at Shell gas stations. The ads were aimed at typical drivers, helping inform them how to avoid wasting gasoline through such tips as not making jackrabbit starts, ensuring proper tire inflation, regular oil changes and proper basic maintenance of their vehicle, as well as guidance on how to get the most out of heating one's home.

The campaign was developed in the late 1960s for Shell by the advertising firm of Ogilvy & Mather, a relationship that would continue for nearly four decades. Print ads addressed other oil uses, such as touting the benefits of switching to an oil-powered hot water heater and encouraging those using oil to heat their homes to ensure they have enough oil in their tank before the cold weather arrives. By the time Shell ended the relationship in 1999, Ogilvy & Mather had 60 employees based in Houston, Texas largely dedicated to the Shell account, and when O&M closed the office in Houston it dropped other local accounts that it could no longer justify supporting.

Actor and announcer Don Morrow appeared in the campaign in the 1960s, offering tips to drivers. Actor Vince O'Brien landed the role of the Shell Answer Man in the late 1960s and 1970s, an opportunity he described in a newspaper interview as being "like hitting the state lottery." O'Brien's balding, mature appearance made him an effective authority figure in the campaign. Actor Richard Anderson played the role of the Shell Answer Man in the 1970s and 1980s.

 

Companion Booklets
 
There were 2 series of companion booklets published. Each booklet consisting of 4 two sided pages. 
 
Shell Answer Books (1976-82)
Bold Numbers on upper left corner
 
01 The Early Warning Book - How you can spot some car problems before they cost big money. - by Russ Russo ©1976
 
02 The Breakdown Book - A shell survival manual for car trouble on the road - by Sandra Bundy ©1976
 
03 The Gasoline Mileage Book - How to save gasoline when you buy a car, drive a car, and take care of a car - by Dave Berry ©1977

 
04 The Car Buying and Selling Book - 11 Things you should know when you buy, sell or trade a car - by John P. Finsland ©1976
 
05 The 100,000 Mile Book - How to help your car do it, but not show it - by Norman Goldbeck ©1976
 
06 The Rush Hour Book - How America cuts the cost and headache of driving to work - by Stan Stocks ©1976

07 The Driving Emergency Book - How to react to seven dangerous surprises while behind the wheel. - by Nancy Curry
 
08 - The Car Repair Shopping Book - What the driver and mechanic can do to take the hassle out of car repairs - by Howard Judson ©1977
 
09 The Car Crime Prevent Book - How to fight back before you get ripped off - by Al Brooks ©1977

 
10 - Car Fix-Up - How to make your car look better and hold its value longer - by A.D. (Buzz) Bazzarone ©1977
 
11  - The Foul Weather Driving Book - Safety tips you should know when Driving in rain, fog and snow - by Bruce Galbraith ©1977
 
12 - The Unexpected Dangers Book - Some car products are dangerous if used the wrong way, here are the right ways. - by Jerry Berger ©1978
 
13 - The Emergency Repair Book - Simple things almost anyone can do to deal with car trouble on the Road - by Dick Hall  ©1978
 
14 - The Driving Skills Book - Are you as good a driver as you think? Test yourself. - by Carol Nau ©1978
 
15 The Accident Book - What to do if you see one, have one, or cause one ©1978

16 - The Home Security Book.- Easy inexpensive ways to protect your home from intruders - by Dick LaFaver  ©1978
 
17 - The Self Service Book - Why self serve should be more than pumping your own gas - by Carroll Hansen ©1979
 
18 The Tune-Up Book - What one is, what one does, and how to get the best value
 
19 - The Gasoline Book - How to choose the right gasoline for your car and get the most out of it. - by John Bame ©1979
 
20 The Chemical Do's and Don'ts Book - 
 
21 The Driving Hazards Book - How to open your eyes to potential accidents before they become real. 
 
22 - The Home Energy-Saving Book - Some simple ways to help you save up to 50% on home energy. - by Sheldon Lambert ©1980
 
23 - The How your Car works Book - A guide to the understanding and care of your car - by Howard Schmitz ©1980
 
24 - The More Miles for Your Money Book - How you could cut your gasoline cost by $300 a year - or more. - by Larry Olejnik  ©1980
 
25 - The Energy Independence Book - How to help regain control of our energy future by finding more and using less - by Dr. Sheldon Lambert ©1981
 
26 The Conservation Bonus Book - How to spend part of your gasoline budget on things that are more fun.
 
27 - The Energy Countdown Book - How we can buy time until other energy sources are ready. - by Dr. Charles S. Matthews  ©1981
 
28 
 
29 - The On-the-Spot Repair Book - How to deal with sudden car problems - yourself. - by Harry Jones ©1982
 
30 The First Aid On The Road Book - How you might save the life of an accident Victim
 
31 The Longer Car Life Book - How To Make It Last And Why
 
32 The Fire Safety Book - How To Prevent Fires At Home ©1982
 
 
Shell Answer Series (1990-91) Some unnumbered others numbered in small print
 
01 The Emergency Repair Book - Simple ways to deal with car trouble on the road
 
02 The Environment Book - Protect your car and the environment
 
03 The Early Warning Book - How to keep your car healthy
 
04 - Driver's Security Tips - Guard against attack in and around your car - by Ray Bergeron ©1990 unnumbered
 
05 - Better Mileage Tips - How to get more miles per Gallon - by Bob Chapman © 1991 numbered

References

Advertising campaigns
Shell plc